Elisabeth Belliveau (born November 27, 1979) is a Canadian interdisciplinary artist and author of four graphic novels. Based in Edmonton, Alberta, she is an Assistant Professor of Fine Arts at MacEwan University Faculty of Fine Arts and Communications.

Early life and education 
Belliveau was born in Antigonish Nova Scotia in 1979. She completed her BFA in at the Alberta College of Art and Design in Calgary, Alberta and a MFA in Fibres at Concordia University in Montréal, Quebec.

Work

Major exhibitions 
In 2019 she was one of 39 artists chosen to exhibit at the MOMENTA Biennale de l’image.

Public collections 
Belliveau has two works in the Alberta Foundation for the Arts collection.

References

External links 

 Artist's web page http://www.elisabeth-belliveau.com/
Artist's video work https://vimeo.com/user2619506

21st-century Canadian artists
21st-century Canadian women artists
1979 births
Living people